Waterford is a neighborhood in southeastern Lexington, Kentucky, United States. Its boundaries are Man o' War Boulevard to the north, Hickman Creek to the east, rural Fayette County to the west, and a combination of Poplar Springs Lane and Vermillion Peak Way to the south.

Neighborhood statistics

 Area: 
 Population: 1,481
 Population density: 4,327 people per square mile
 Median household income (2010): $84,619

References

Neighborhoods in Lexington, Kentucky